Video Smash Hits was an Australian music television show which was broadcast on the Seven Network in the early- to mid-1990s. It is not to be confused with Video Hits, Network Ten's long running music video show which aired opposite Video Smash Hits on Saturday mornings. Both shows shared the same format.

Hosts 
Video Smash Hits featured four hosts during the run of the series: Michael Horrocks, Home and Away's Emily Symons, Toni Pearen, and A Country Practice's Kym Wilson (who replaced Symons after she left the show "in disgust").

Merchandise 
The popularity of the program also saw two compilation CDs released and a variety of 'Video Magazines' from 1991 to 1993 in association with the popular music magazine Smash Hits.

See also

 List of Australian music television shows

External links
Video Smash Hits at the National Film and Sound Archive

Seven Network original programming
Australian music television series
1990 Australian television series debuts
1994 Australian television series endings